In molecular biology, the EcoEI R protein C-terminal domain is a protein domain found at the C-terminus of both the R subunit of type I restriction enzymes and the Res subunit of type III restriction enzymes. The type I enzymes include EcoEI, which recognises 5'-GAGN(7)ATGC-3; the R protein (HsdR) is required for both nuclease and ATPase activity.

References

Protein families
Protein domains